John Howard Keltner (1928 – July 29, 1998) was an American comics publisher, artist, writer, and indexer. He was a founding member of the Academy of Comic Book Arts and Sciences, co-editor and co-publisher of Star-Studded Comics, created the character Doctor Weird, and provided art to fan publications such as CAPA-alpha and The Rocket's Blast. His Golden Age Comic Books Index, begun in 1953, influenced other later indexes, such as the Overstreet Comic Book Price Guide.

References

External links

1928 births
1998 deaths
American comics artists
American comics creators
American comics writers
Silver Age comics creators